Grand Theft Auto IV is an action-adventure video game developed by Rockstar North and published by Rockstar Games. Upon its release in 2008 for the PlayStation 3 and Xbox 360, the game generated controversy for its depiction of violence, occasionally being referred to as a "murder simulator". The ability to drive under the influence of alcohol in the game also received criticism, resulting in a request for the Entertainment Software Rating Board (ESRB) to change the game's rating. Similarly, some gameplay features were censored for the Australian and New Zealand versions of the game, though these were subsequently reinstated. Several crimes committed following the game's release, such as murder and sexual violence, were attributed to the perpetrators' experience with the game, generating further controversy. Former attorney Jack Thompson, known for his campaigns against the Grand Theft Auto series, heavily criticised Grand Theft Auto IV prior to its release, filing lawsuits against Rockstar's parent company Take-Two Interactive and threatening to ban distribution if some gameplay features were not removed. The game also generated further controversy and lawsuits from city officials and organisations.

Gameplay features

Depiction of violence 

Grand Theft Auto IV was widely criticised for its depiction of violence and murder. On his program, conservative American talk-radio host Glenn Beck used the game as an example to make wider claims about the use of violent video games by the U.S. military, repeating claims made by Lt. Col. Dave Grossman that the military uses shooting games to desensitise soldiers to killing. Beck also spoke to Jack Thompson, who labelled the game as a "murder simulator". Gavin McKiernan, national grass roots director for the Parents Television Council, added that the game is an "adult product", claiming that research displayed the potential effect violent media has on children. Thompson reiterated that the game should be re-rated in the United States, referring to the Australian release as an example.

There have been a number of reported crimes in which the perpetrators cited Grand Theft Auto IV as their primary influence. On 27 June 2008, six teenagers were arrested after participating in a crime spree in New Hyde Park, New York. The teenagers mugged a man, knocking his teeth out, attempted to hijack a car, and smashed a passing van with a bat. According to the Nassau County Police, the teenagers claimed that they were inspired by Grand Theft Auto IV. On 4 August 2008, BBC Newsbeat reported that an 18-year-old student had been arrested in Bangkok, Thailand for the murder of a taxi driver after attempting to hijack the vehicle. Bangkok police captain Veerarit Pipatanasak stated that the student "wanted to find out if it was as easy in real life to rob a taxi as it was in the game", and Grand Theft Auto IV was subsequently banned in Thailand as a result. In August 2013, 87-year-old Marie Smothers was killed in Slaughter, Louisiana when her grandson, an eight-year-old boy, shot her in the head with a handgun after playing Grand Theft Auto IV; under state law, the boy could not be charged for her death due to his age.

Drunk driving option 

In Grand Theft Auto IV, the player can choose to make protagonist Niko Bellic and his non-playable friends become intoxicated, resulting in the game's perspective becoming shaky and blurry. Players also have the option to enter cars while intoxicated and to drive under the influence of alcohol. This gameplay feature received criticism, particularly from the nonprofit organisation Mothers Against Drunk Driving (MADD), who referred to the action as a "choice, a violent crime" and that it is "100 percent preventable". As a result, MADD requested the Entertainment Software Rating Board (ESRB) to change the rating of the game from "Mature" (17+) to "Adults Only" (18+), which would have effectively removed the game from retail stock. They also asked Take-Two Interactive and Rockstar Games to consider halting the game's distribution out of a sense of social responsibility or out of respect for victims of driving under the influence. Rockstar later issued a statement to the Associated Press:
We have a great deal of respect for MADD's mission, but we believe the mature audience for Grand Theft Auto IV is more than sophisticated enough to understand the game's content.

Sex and nudity allegations 
In November 2008, 19-year-old Ryan Chinnery was jailed for performing two sexual attacks on women at night. During the court hearings, it was told that Chinnery had spent considerable hours playing Grand Theft Auto IV. The judge said that Chinnery's experience with the game "cannot have helped him in all the circumstances of this case".

Grand Theft Auto: The Lost and Damned, the first episodic expansion to Grand Theft Auto IV, features a cutscene displaying full-frontal male nudity. The parents group Common Sense Media condemned the expansion, claiming that the inclusion of nudity resulted in the game's status as "more controversial than its predecessors". Rockstar vice president Dan Houser stated that the sexual content was intended to be humorous and hoped that "the fans" would recognise this.

Censored release 

Despite confirmation in February 2008 that the Australian version of Grand Theft Auto IV would not be edited, Rockstar later revealed that some features would be censored. The game was assigned an MA15+ rating on 11 December 2007. Rockstar stated that a special version of the game was produced to comply with the Australian classification system. Features censored in the Australian versions include the inability to select a "service" when hiring a prostitute, and the restriction of animation and camera angles; the lack of blood pools and bloody footprints; the replacement of bullet wounds and blood patches with "slight discolouration".  In December 2008, a Rockstar spokesman stated that the game would be released uncensored in Australia for its release on Windows, with an MA15+ certificate. In February 2009, Rockstar distributed a patch that uncensored the Australian release for consoles.

On 15 April 2008, it was announced that the New Zealand release of the game would be identical to the censored Australian release, with Take-Two Interactive citing "time scales and logistical reasons". Bill Hastings, Chief Censor for the New Zealand Office of Film and Literature Classification (OFLC), stated that Rockstar "did not tell [the OFLC] which version of the game they submitted", and that "the version [Rockstar] submitted for classification was the version they intended to market in New Zealand". However, the game was resubmitted to the OFLC by Stan Calif, a 21-year-old student in Auckland who was unhappy that he had received an edited version of the game as a result of Australian censorship laws. The unedited version was subsequently given an R18 rating and cleared for sale in New Zealand.

Political response 

In 2007, then-Florida lawyer Jack Thompson, who had previously campaigned against other games from Rockstar, stated that he would take measures to prevent the sale of Grand Theft Auto IV to minors. On 14 March 2007, Rockstar's parent company Take-Two Interactive filed a lawsuit against Thompson in an attempt to preemptively restrict his attempts to declare Rockstar's games as a nuisance. Games declared to be a nuisance are effectively banned for sale, which Take-Two believed would be a violation of First Amendment rights. Thompson responded by filing a countersuit accusing Take-Two of violating federal RICO statues, committing perjury, obstruction of justice, and conspiring against him with third parties to deprive him of his civil rights.

On 20 April 2007, both parties reached a settlement agreeing to drop their respective lawsuits. Under the terms of the settlement, Thompson was barred from suing to ban the sale or distribution of games by Take-Two or its subsidiaries. He was restricted to communicating through Take-Two's attorneys on any future matter, but is able to maintain his outspoken stance against their titles and may act as counsel in lawsuits against Take-Two by other parties. For their part, Take-Two agreed to drop the contempt of court lawsuit against Thompson regarding alleged improper conduct during the court hearings for Rockstar's game Bully in 2006.

On 18 September 2007, Thompson filed a document with a federal court in Florida, claiming that the assassination target of a mission in Grand Theft Auto IV is a lawyer character based upon himself. When the player enters his office and brandishes a weapon, the lawyer yells, "Guns don't kill people, video games do!", a phrase often attributed to Thompson. Thompson threatened that he would "take necessary and proper means to stop release of the game" if the similarities were not removed; when the changes were not made, Thompson did not follow through. On 25 April 2008, Metro reported that Thompson had written a letter to the mother of Strauss Zelnick, director of Take-Two Interactive, in which he strongly criticised both the game and Zelnick's upbringing and labelled Grand Theft Auto as a "murder simulator". He follows:

The pornography and violence that your son trafficks in is the kind of stuff that most mother would be ashamed to see their son putting into the hands of other mothers' children [...] Maybe you, Mrs. Zelnick, were so taken by your handsome son that you spared the rod and spoiled the child. That would explain why he has brought you, by the way he presently acts, "to shame." [...] Happy Mother's day, Mrs. Zelnick, which this year is [...] two weeks after your son unleashes porn and violence upon other mothers' boys. I'm sure you're very proud.

Thompson subsequently claimed that he sent the letter to Zelnick's lawyer instead of his mother and formulated it as a parody intended to induce feelings of "shame" in Zelnick.

Following the release of the game's first trailer, New York City officials were appalled with the choice of their city as the inspiration for the setting, stating that a game like Grand Theft Auto does not represent the city's crime levels accurately. A spokesperson for Mayor Michael Bloomberg said that he "does not support any video game where you earn points for injuring or kill police officers". In response, Jason Della Rocca, executive director of the International Game Developers Association, accused New York City officials of double standards, for criticising video games of using the city, but avoiding the argument in terms of other forms of entertainment, such as books, films and television shows.

Legal action 
Take-Two Interactive filed a lawsuit in response to the Chicago Transit Authority (CTA) removing advertisements promoting the game from their property, which violated a contract that requires the advertisements to remain until June 2008. In response, a representative from the CTA attributed the removal of the advertisements to the controversy surrounding the advertisement campaign for Grand Theft Auto: San Andreas in 2004.

References

External links
 
 

Controversy
Grand Theft Auto IV
Grand Theft Auto IV
Grand Theft Auto 4
Criticisms of software and websites
Obscenity controversies in video games